Jules Vertriest (born 1 January 1897, date of death unknown) was a Belgian racing cyclist. He rode in the 1923 Tour de France.

References

1897 births
Year of death missing
Belgian male cyclists
Place of birth missing